Compsoptera jourdanaria is a moth of the family Geometridae. It was described by Serres in 1826. It is found in France, Spain, Portugal and on Sardinia and Corsica.

The wingspan is 30–36 mm for males and 29–39 mm for females. Adults are on wing from September to October.

The larvae feed on Santolina, Thymus, Helichrysum and Dorycnium species.

Subspecies
According to BioLib :
Compsoptera jourdanaria anargyra (Turati, 1913)
Compsoptera jourdanaria jourdanaria (Serres, 1826)

References

External links
Lepiforum.de

Moths described in 1826
Ennominae
Moths of Europe